Maria Claudia Lacouture (born 1974, Santa Marta, Colombia) was the Colombian Minister of Commerce, Industry, Tourism between May 2016 and August 2017. Previously was president of ProColombia (August 2010 - April 2016). Since October 3rd 2017 is the Executive Director of the Colombo American Chamber of Commerce (AmCham Colombia) In October 2019 she  launched her first book "Turismo Sostenible" (Sustainable Tourism), published by Planeta.  She is also an international consultant, lecturer and columnist at La República, one of the largest economic newspapers of Colombia

Education
Maria Claudia Lacouture studied Finance and International Relations at the University Externado de Colombia, and then pursued further postgraduate studies in Marketing and Economics at Cornell University in the United States.

Biography
She is currently the Executive Director of the Colombo American Chamber of Commerce, (AmCham Colombia). She was Minister of Commerce, Industry and Tourism (2016-2017), President of ProColombia (2010-2016), Manager of the 'Colombia es Pasión' campaign and Vice-president of 'Imagen País' (2007-2009).

In 2015, Fast Company magazine rated her as the fourth most creative person in the business world from a list of 100 people which included Google, Nike, Pinterest and General Electric representatives among others.

Maria Claudia worked as a researcher for the Swiss Multinational consulting company Egon Zehnder International and also held roles as Content Administrator and Coordinator at Yupi Internet in Miami where she was in charge of dealing with business content for the B2B at Yupi.com and the development of the online bilingual business portal for the Americas.

She also worked as a specialist in foreign trade at Trade Wing Networks for product development of agricultural goods and sales strategy for Colombian coffee in the US market.

She started working at ProColombia in the Market Intelligence area in Bogotá and afterwards served as Marketing and Foreign Trade consultant and Tourism Director in the Commercial Office in United States, where she led the strategy for international cruise liners to return to Colombia.

In the Commerce, Industry and Tourism sector it is to highlight her leadership in implementing and promoting thirteen trade agreements which give access to Colombian entrepreneurs to 1.5 billion consumers in 73 countries, trade facilitation, paperwork reduction for enterprise creation, promotion of best practices and enterprise formalization, regional development and fighting against smuggling and unfair trade.

She led a strategy for diversifying non-traditional exports which achieved to position 850 new products in the international markets, with more than 1,200 new export companies, a growth of 600% in investment and 95% in tourism.

It was also consolidated the government purpose of removing export barriers and reducing management procedures in foreign trade in addition to the measures to improve competitiveness in the industry, innovation and entrepreneurship.

For consolidating Tourism, María Claudia Lacouture, created, structured and developed the  touristic corridors strategy for the development of new destinations and the integration of regional routes including zones that once were vulnerable during the armed conflict, and launched the international campaign of Colombia as a world touristic bird-watching destination.

On September 26, 2017, the former Minister Lacouture was given the Order of Merit 'Carlos Lleras Restrepo', awarded by ANALDEX for her contribution to the development of Colombian exports.

Minister Lacouture's management was recognized by Colombian entrepreneurs in a business survey carried out by La República newspaper, as one of the best government officials while she was in charge of the Ministry.

In October 2019 she launched her first book “Turismo Sostenible” (Sustainable Tourism), published by Planeta, through which she proposes a decalogue of actions to strengthen the institutionality of tourism, the professionalization of the sector, innovation, technology and quality of this industry that has become the protagonist of the Colombian economy.

She is also an international consultant, lecturer and columnist.

Blog de Maria Claudia Lacouture
 
Turismo Sostenible, first book of María Claudia Lacouture. 

Follow María Claudia Lacouture in social media

Twitter
 
Instagram
 
Facebook

YouTube

References

1974 births
Living people
Cornell University alumni
Colombian politicians